Estonia is set to participate in the Eurovision Song Contest 2023 in Liverpool, United Kingdom, with "Bridges" performed by Alika. The Estonian broadcaster Eesti Rahvusringhääling (ERR) organised the national final  2023 in order to select the Estonian entry for the 2023 contest.

Background 

In , "Hope" performed by Stefan qualified Estonia to the final, where it placed 13th.

The Estonian national broadcaster, Eesti Rahvusringhääling (ERR), broadcasts the event within Estonia and organises the selection process for the nation's entry. ERR confirmed Estonia's participation at the 2023 Eurovision Song Contest on 1 August 2022. Since their debut, the Estonian broadcaster has organised national finals that feature a competition among multiple artists and songs in order to select Estonia's entry for the Eurovision Song Contest. The Eesti Laul competition has been organised since 2009 in order to select Estonia's entry, and on 13 September 2022, ERR announced the organisation of  2023 in order to select the nation's 2023 entry.

Before Eurovision

Eesti Laul 2023 
 2023 was the fifteenth edition of the Estonian national selection , which selected Estonia's entry for the Eurovision Song Contest 2023. The competition consisted of twenty entries competing in two semi-finals on 12 and 14 January 2023 leading to a twelve-song final on 11 February 2023.

Format 
The format of the competition included two semi-finals on 12 and 14 January 2023 and a final on 11 February 2023. Ten songs competed in each semi-final and the top five from each semi-final qualified. The results of the semi-finals were determined by the 50/50 combination of votes from a professional jury and public televoting for the first four qualifiers, and a second round of public televoting for the fifth qualifier. The public also selected two wildcards out of the remaining non-qualifying acts from both semi-finals to complete the twelve song lineup in the final. The winning song in the final was selected over two rounds of voting: the first round results selected the top three songs via the 50/50 combination of jury and public voting, while the second round (superfinal) determined the winner solely by public televoting.

Competing entries 
On 13 September 2022, ERR opened the submission period for artists and composers to submit their entries up until 20 October 2022 through an online upload platform. Each artist and songwriter was only able to submit a maximum of five entries. Foreign collaborations were allowed as long as 50% of the songwriters were Estonian. A fee was also imposed on songs being submitted to the competition, with €50 for songs in the Estonian language and €100 for songs in other languages; both of the fees were doubled for entries submitted from 17 October 2022. 217 submissions were received by the deadline, of which 92 were in Estonian. A 16-member jury panel selected 20 semi-finalists from the submissions and the selected songs were announced during the ETV entertainment program  on 1 and 2 November 2022. The selection jury consisted of Ahto Kruusmann, Alar Kotkas, Andres Aljaste, Carola Madis, Ingrid Kohtla, Janika Sillamaa, Karl-Erik Taukar, Kristiina Kraus, Lenna, Margus Kamlat, Marta Püssa, Ott Lepland, Simon Jay and Vaido Pannel.  were originally supposed to perform their entry "Salalik" together with Ultima Thule, but the latter band withdrew after its member Riho Sibul died in November 2022.

Semi-finals 
The two semi-finals took place on 12 and 14 January 2023 at the Viimsi Artium in Viimsi, hosted by Tõnis Niinemets and Grete Kuld. In each semi-final ten songs competed for the first four spots in the final with the outcome decided upon by the combination of the votes from a jury panel and a public televote, with the remaining qualifier decided by an additional televote between the remaining non-qualifiers.

In addition to the performances of the competing entries, the band Minimal Wind with Janika Sillama, who represented Estonia in the Eurovision Song Contest 1993, the duo Chlicherik and Mäx, and the hosts Tõnis Niinemets and Grete Kuld performed as the interval acts in the first semi-final, while singers Grete Paia with Sven Lõhmus, Kerli Kõiv with Kristjan Järvi, and Yasmyn performed as the interval acts in the second semi-final.

Wildcard selection 
A further televote was held between the non-qualifiers in the semi-finals in order to select the two wildcard finalists. Voting took place between 15 and 16 January 2023 and the two qualifiers were announced during the ETV entertainment program  on 16 January.

Final 
The final took place on 11 February 2023 at the Tondiraba Ice Hall in Tallinn, hosted by Tõnis Niinemets and Grete Kuld. The five entries that qualified from each of the two preceding semi-finals and the two wildcard qualifiers, all together twelve songs, competed during the show. The winner was selected over two rounds of voting. In the first round, a jury (50%) and public televote (50%) determined the top three entries to proceed to the superfinal. In the superfinal, "Bridges" performed by Alika was selected as the winner entirely by a public televote. The jury panel that voted in the first round of the final consisted of Alma (Finnish musician), Birgit Simal (Belgian television producer), Kat Reinhert (American vocal teacher, songwriter and Berklee College of Music professor), Lucas Gullbing (Swedish music producer), Deban Aderemi (British journalist at Wiwibloggs), Matthew Tryba (American music producer and songwriter), Anja Roglić (television producer and music editor at the Radio Television of Serbia), Joe Bennett (American musicologist), Tim Hall (American musician and Berklee College of Music professor), Tomi Saarinen (CEO of Live Nation Finland) and Yves Shifferele (Swiss Eurovision Head of Delegation).

In addition to the performances of the competing entries, the band Zetod opened the show, while Stefan, who represented Estonia in the Eurovision Song Contest 2022, the group Púr Múdd with Ines, who represented Estonia in the Eurovision Song Contest 2000, the band 2 Quick Start, singer Karl-Erik Taukar and pianist Rein Rannap performed as interval acts.

At Eurovision 
According to Eurovision rules, all nations with the exceptions of the host country and the "Big Five" (France, Germany, Italy, Spain and the United Kingdom) are required to qualify from one of two semi-finals in order to compete for the final; the top ten countries from each semi-final progress to the final. The European Broadcasting Union (EBU) split up the competing countries into six different pots based on voting patterns from previous contests, with countries with favourable voting histories put into the same pot. On 31 January 2023, an allocation draw was held, which placed each country into one of the two semi-finals, and determined which half of the show they would perform in. Estonia has been placed into the second semi-final, to be held on 11 May 2023, and has been scheduled to perform in the first half of the show.

References

External links 

 

2023
Countries in the Eurovision Song Contest 2023
Eurovision